The Anna Cross is a 1954 Soviet film directed by Isidor Annensky.  It won the "Golden Olive Branch" prize at the International Film Festival in Italy in 1957

Plot 
This is the story of a very beautiful and pleasant woman, who is not burdened with high moral standards. The first choice in her life is a marriage of convenience that shut out those who genuinely loved Anna, and at the same time introduced her into the brilliant world of Moscow's society.

Cast
 Alla Larionova as Anna
 Vladimir Vladislavskiy as Modest Alekseyevich 
 Aleksandr Sashin-Nikolsky as Pyotr Leontievich, father
 Mikhail Zharov as Artynov
 Alexander Vertinsky as The Prince  
 Irina Murzaeva as Mavra Grigorievna
 Pyotr Maltsev as Petya, kid brother (as Petya Maltsev)
 Aleksandr Metyolkin as Andryusha, kid brother (as Sasha Metyolkin)
 Tatyana Pankova as The Dressmaker
 Vladimir Shishkin as Dezdyemonov
 Gennady Zaichkin as Shegolyev
 Natalya Belyovtseva as The Princess  
 Alexey Gribov as Ivan Ivanovich	
 Vladimir Soshalsky as officer
 Vera Altayskaya  as lady in a carriage

Release 
The film was watched by 31.9 million Soviet viewers, which is the 314th highest figure in the history of Soviet film distribution.

References

External links 
 

1954 films
Soviet drama films
1950s Russian-language films
Films based on works by Anton Chekhov
Gorky Film Studio films
1954 drama films